The 2022 MEAC women's basketball tournament was the postseason women's basketball tournament for the 2021–22 season in the Mid-Eastern Athletic Conference (MEAC). The tournament took place March 9–12, 2022. The tournament winner will receive an automatic invitation to the 2022 NCAA Division I women's basketball tournament.

Seeds 
All eligible teams are seeded by record within the conference, with a tiebreaker system to seed teams with identical conference records.

Schedule

Bracket

References 

2021–22 Mid-Eastern Athletic Conference women's basketball season
MEAC women's basketball tournament
College basketball tournaments in Virginia
Basketball competitions in Virginia
Women's sports in Virginia
MEAC women's basketball tournament
MEAC women's basketball tournament